Bradley Garrett (born January 4, 1981) is an American social and cultural geographer at University College Dublin in Ireland and a writer for The Guardian newspaper in the United Kingdom. He describes his research interests as being at the intersections of cultural geography, archaeology and visual methods and writes that his research is about "finding the hidden in the world". He is the author of five books including Bunker: Building for the End Times, a contemporary account of doomsday preppers around the world, and Explore Everything: Place-Hacking the City, an ethnographic account of the activities of the London Consolidation Crew (LCC), a group of urban explorers Garrett calls "place hackers".

In addition to his work in human geography, Garrett has published academic research papers in archaeology, history, ethics, criminology, and visual methods.

Education 
Garrett received a B.S. in anthropology and B.A. in history from the University of California, Riverside in 2003 before moving to Australia to undertake an MSc in maritime archaeology at James Cook University in 2005. He did his first ethnographic research with the Winnemem Wintu tribe in Northern California about their loss of access to ancestral land inundated by the construction of Shasta Dam. He then worked for private archaeology firms in Hawaii and for the Bureau of Land Management in California as an archaeologist.

In 2008, Garrett moved to the United Kingdom where he completed a PhD in social and cultural geography at Royal Holloway, University of London, with a thesis entitled Tales of Urban Exploration. He was supervised by the human geographer Tim Cresswell.

Career 
Upon completion of his PhD, Garrett took up a two-year postdoctoral research post at School of Geography and the Environment, University of Oxford from 2012 to 2014, where he was a fellow of Wolfson College, Oxford. He then worked for two years at the University of Southampton before moving to the University of Sydney in Australia, where he was a research fellow and conducted multi-year ethnographic research with "doomsday preppers" building for apocalyptic scenarios.

His first book is Explore Everything: Place-Hacking the City. The book describes the exploits of the LCC, as they trespassed into hundred of locations over five years in an attempt to "reveal the hidden city". The book was chosen by Rowan Moore of The Guardian as one of the best architecture books of 2013. Garrett claims the goal of this work was to re-map London by opening out vertical urban imaginations and exposing the ways in which surveillance and control are embedded in modern spatial planning. Garrett suggests surveillance is subverted and rendered inert through the urban explorer's "place hack" when control of the city is temporarily taken back through creative practice. In a 2014 TEDx talk entitled "Trespass is Good for Cities", Garrett told the audience that "When we explore cities, when we ignore the "no trespassing" signs and cross those borders, whether we can see them or not, we open up opportunities for critical creativity, we re-create space and we make the impossible possible." Garrett was also invited to speak about his research at the Festival of Dangerous Ideas at the Sydney Opera House and at Google Zeitgeist in 2014, where he shared a session with Bill Clinton, the 42nd President of the United States.

In his public lectures, Garrett describes how the LCC came to notoriety first in 2011 when they released photos of the mothballed London Post Office Railway, a 6.5-mile subterranean train network used by the Post Office to transport post across the city. Near the end of his research project, Garrett followed the LCC as they systematically infiltrated abandoned Tube stations in the London Underground without permission and posted photos online. Soon after, Garrett began appearing on UK media discussing these explorations, describing himself as "the scribe for the tribe".

In a 2013 interview with Will Storr for The Daily Telegraph, Garrett described "place hacking", otherwise known as urban exploration, as a way of "...seeing the city like it's a puzzle and putting the pieces of that puzzle together, connecting things". Garrett went on to explain that "...the more we feel like there are things we can't do and places we can't see, the more urban exploration has [a] capacity to give people hope".

In 2015, Garrett was the recipient of the James Cook University Early Career Alumni Award for the College of Arts, Society and Education in Queensland, Australia.

In February 2016 Garrett, along with writer Will Self, Green Party mayoral candidate Siân Berry, writer Anna Minton and comedian Mark Thomas, staged a mass trespass onto land owned by property group More London in protest of the privatisation of public space in the city. The group occupied a private amphitheater called The Scoop and held an unsanctioned 2-hour event for a crowd of people. On the Facebook page for the event, Garrett wrote that "one of the subsidiary effects of the rampant redevelopment of the city is that when the construction dust settles, often we find that open-air public spaces once maintained by civil bodies have been quietly passed into the hands of corporations as part of austerity-driven buyouts...It is time for our urban rambler moment; it is time to reclaim our cities." As a result of this campaigning, the Mayor of London, Sadiq Khan, established a charter regulating the management of privately owned public spaces in the capital.

In 2016, Garrett also released a virtual reality project built in collaboration with The Guardian called "Underworld", which allows users to venture through the 'lost' Fleet River under London guided by Garrett who "guides users from the blood sewers beneath Smithfield Market in the City of London down to the Thames."

Garrett wrote a news column for Guardian Cities where public space, trespass and the underground are frequent themes. Whilst recording for the 2016 BBC World Service radio show "The Forum" with Bridget Kendall, Garrett stated "if the 20th century was the age of the skyscraper then the 21st century is probably the age of the tunnel."

In 2017, Garrett began a three-year research fellowship at the University of Sydney, which involved embedding himself with doomsday prepper communities around the world who were preparing for a global disaster. The resulting book, published in 2020, in first few months of the COVID-19 pandemic, was completed with eerie timeliness, according to writer Robert Macfarlane. The book received positive reviews from US and UK media outlets.

In July 2020, as part of the launch of Bunker: Building for the End Times, Garrett was a guest on The Joe Rogan Experience hosted by Joe Rogan. In the interview, Garrett revealed that he had purchased a forest cabin in Big Bear Lake, California, where he'd begun to stockpile supplies for widespread social, political, or environmental breakdown.

Books 
 Explore Everything: Place-Hacking the City (2013)
 Subterranean London: Cracking the Capital (2014)
 London Rising: Illicit Photos from the City's Heights (2016)
 Global Undergrounds: Exploring Cities Within (2016)
 Bunker: Building for the End Times (2020)

In addition, Garrett has authored over 50 academic publications, including journal articles and book chapters.

Controversy 
Garrett has been criticised for being too close to his project participants and failing to maintain objective distance as a researcher. In 2011, four of his project participants were arrested inside the London Tube on Easter. Garrett himself was later also arrested at Heathrow Airport by British Transport Police investigating the group's means of access to abandoned Tube stations. Garrett maintains that he does ethnography in the tradition of the Chicago school and claims the only way to understand a culture is to become fully immersed in it. The charges against Garrett concluded with a three-year conditional discharge and a £2000 fine being issued by the court.

Will Self came to the defence of Garrett and the urban explorers, writing in the London Evening Standard that "place-hackers are performing a valuable service by reminding us that the city should, in principle, belong to its citizens"  University of Oxford Halford Mackinder Professor of Geography Professor Danny Dorling also spoke out at the end of the case, contending that the prosecution had been a fundamental breach of academic liberty. In an interview with The Guardian in 2016, Garrett said "I realise that the trauma we were subjected to was actually the point. What the British Transport police wanted to do was stop me from publishing photos [of the sites visited] and stop me from writing about this thing, because what we did undermined their narrative of security."

A 2018 European Ethics Framework published by PRO-RES suggested that Garrett's research was ethically problematic because, "Garrett adopts various professional and personal roles – sometimes he is an ethnographer, sometimes an urban explorer, sometimes a political activist, film-maker or gonzo journalist."

Popular references 
In the 2015 book of short stories Three Moments of an Explosion: Stories by China Miéville, the character Infiltrex is based on Garrett.

In the 2017 book The Last London by Iain Sinclair, Sinclair writes about how Garrett and friends in London had been busy constructing a network of illegal structures they called "urban bothies". Sinclair writes that "They are bivouacs, where people are free to rest, write, eat, sleep, disguised by black paint and a padlock. They look like any other workman's hut, within the dead zones of some of the most secure and spooked enclaves in the City of London."

In the 2019 book Underland: A Deep Time Journey by Robert Macfarlane (writer), part of the chapter entitled "Invisible Cities" is based around Macfarlane's explorations with Garrett underground in London and Wales. Macfarlane also describes acting as a character witness in Garrett's trial with the London Consolidation Crew. He writes, "As well as a daredevil adventurer's streak, Bradley had an archaeologist's interest in contemporary forms of obsolescence, and a natural historian's interest in how the wild returned to abandoned places... I came to associate my time away with Bradley with adrenaline, alcohol, and extreme fatigue."

References

External links 
Dr Bradley Garrett at University College Dublin
Bradley Garrett's website
Place Hacking

Living people
Social geographers
Academics of University College Dublin
University of California, Riverside alumni
1981 births
American expatriate academics